Etna (formerly Etha) is an unincorporated community in Custer County, Nebraska, United States.

A post office was established at Etna in 1885, and remained in operation until it was discontinued in 1921. Etna no longer exists, a simple roadside marker indicates the location of the former town. The school survived until 1966, but most other establishments (general store, post office, etc.) closed in 1931. There is a mailbox next to the marker with a book of historical information about Etna and a guest book to sign.

References

Unincorporated communities in Custer County, Nebraska
Unincorporated communities in Nebraska